Mlappara  is a village in Idukki district in the state of Kerala, India.

Demographics
As of 2011 Census, Mlappara had a population of 1,129 with 535 males and 594 females. In Mlappara, 9.4% of the population was under 6 years of age. Mlappara had an average literacy of 90.8% higher than the national average of 74% and lower than state average of 94%.

References

Villages in Idukki district